Napoleon "Nip" Kaufman (born June 7, 1973) is a former American football player and currently an ordained minister and head football coach at Bishop O'Dowd High School in Oakland, California. He is a former NFL running back, playing for the Oakland Raiders for the entirety of his professional football career.

Early life
Kaufman was born in Kansas City, Missouri and grew up in Lompoc, California, 55 miles west-northwest of Santa Barbara. At Lompoc High School he was one of the greatest high school running backs in California prep history.  As a 135-pound sophomore in 1988, he rushed for 1,008 yards in leading Lompoc to the Southern Section divisional semifinals. As a junior in 1989, he had an even better season. Kaufman was named to the Southern Section All-CIF and All-State first-team, compiling 2,954 all purpose yards and 39 touchdowns, averaging a remarkable 70 yards on kickoff returns. As a senior in 1990, at 5-9, 170, with 4.3 speed in 40 yards, he was named the Cal Hi Sports' California high school football player of the year. Despite injuries, Kaufman rushed for 1,960 yards and 28 touchdowns leading his team to a 13-1 record and a CIF championship won at then-Mustang Stadium. He was also named to the USA Today and Parade Magazine first-team All-American teams. In his high school career, he rushed for 5,151 yards and 86 TDs. Kaufman chose the University of Washington over USC, Colorado, and Arizona.

Kaufman was also an exceptional track athlete. As a junior, Kaufman's personal best in the 100 meters was 10.39 and he was the CIF California State Champion in both 100 (10.57) and 200 meters (21.15). He also was an accomplished long jumper with a personal best of over 24 feet.

College career
In 1991, as a true freshman at Washington, Kaufman returned kicks for the Huskies during the year the team won the national championship. Among his notable collegiate performances was the 1994 "Whammy In Miami" game between the Huskies and the University of Miami at the Orange Bowl, where the Huskies ended Miami's 58-game home winning streak, which dated back to 1985. Kaufman was Washington's all-time leader in rushing yards for 23 years (4,106) and 200-yard games (4), third in rushing touchdowns (34), and tied with Chris Polk for most rushes for 50+ yards (6). In a game against UCLA in 1994 Kaufman set the school's record for longest non-scoring rush with 79 yards. Along with Polk and Myles Gaskin, he is one of only three Washington running backs to rush for 1,000 yards in three consecutive seasons (1992-94: 1,045, 1,299, and 1,390). 

He was named to the All-Pac-10 team in 1992, 1993, and 1994. In 1994, he was a second-team All-American, finished ninth in Heisman Trophy voting (receiving three first-place ballots), and is a member of the University of Washington Hall of Fame.

As of 2022, Kaufman still held UW's career all-purpose yardage record, amassing 5,832 total yards.

Professional career
Kaufman was selected with the 18th pick in the 1st round of the 1995 NFL Draft by the Oakland Raiders, where he remained for the entirety of his 6-year NFL career, amassing 4,792 yards rushing on 4.90 yards per carry. Kaufman scored a touchdown in his first NFL game against the San Diego Chargers.  Kaufman rushed for 490 yards as a rookie backing up Harvey Williams. As the Raiders' primary running back in 1997 and 1998, he rushed for 1,294 and 921 yards, respectively, and had 65 total receptions during those two seasons. Kaufman split playing time with Tyrone Wheatley in the latter part of his career.

On October 19, 1997, in Week 8 of the 1997 season, Kaufman rushed for 227 yards, leading the Raiders to an upset of the undefeated Denver Broncos (the eventual Super Bowl champions that year) and setting the franchise mark for rushing yards in a single game. Kaufman broke the record of 221, set by Bo Jackson in his famous Monday Night Football performance against the Seattle Seahawks on November 30, 1987. Kaufman's record stood for 25 years, until broken by the Raiders' Josh Jacobs on November 27, 2022.

During the latter part of his playing career, Kaufman was the Raiders' chaplain, and baptized several teammates in the whirlpool at the team's practice facility. He retired abruptly at the end of the 2000 NFL season to pursue a career as a Christian minister. Today he is the senior pastor at The Well Christian Community Church in Livermore, California, a church he founded with about 15 families in 2003; as of 2018 the church has over 1,000 regular worshipers. His wife also serves as a pastor, two other former Raiders serve in leadership roles, and Hall of Famer Rod Woodson is a member. He has three sons and one daughter and has been married since September 1996. He also coached in the Pleasanton Junior Football League where his teams went undefeated four years in a row. As of December 2013, Kaufman is the head football coach at Bishop O'Dowd High School in Oakland where all three of his sons have played. Kaufman's Bishop O'Dowd team won the CIF-State Division 5-AA Championship in December 2016. He also returned as the Raiders team chaplain in 2012 and served in that role until the team relocated to Las Vegas in 2020.

NFL career statistics

See also
 Washington Huskies football statistical leaders
 CIF California State Meet alumni

References

External links
 
  - profile at The Well Christian Community.

1973 births
American Christians
American football running backs
Living people
Oakland Raiders players
People from Lompoc, California
Players of American football from California
Players of American football from Kansas City, Missouri
Sportspeople from Santa Barbara County, California
Track and field athletes from California
Track and field athletes from Kansas City, Missouri
Washington Huskies football players